Filmography of Indian film singer, actor, music director and film producer S. P. Balasubrahmanyam.

As actor

Films

Television

Dubbing artist

References 

Male actor filmographies
Indian filmographies
Filmography